The Buyck family (spelling variant: Buijck) is a noble Belgian family which can trace its origins back to the 14th century.

Several members have been prominent in politics, business and economics, architecture, as well as in the military field. Whilst first documented notable was Jan Buyck, Flanders' first Admiral in 1383, the family was granted a heraldic title in 1521 and is credited with co-founding the world's first publicly listed company.

The family has a long history of service to the monarchies in the region of Flanders and the Low Countries, a region that spans today’s countries of Belgium, Netherlands and Luxembourg, as well as links to the Scottish and English crowns. Different descendants have been instated to national orders from the Kingdom of Belgium and knighthood: more specifically to the Order of the Crown, the Order of Leopold, and the Legion of Honour.

Contemporary members of the Buyck family still active in Belgian diplomacy, business, and remains recognised for its longstanding prominence. To the present day the family maintains its institutionalised commitment to philanthropy internationally.

Titles and heraldry

Knighthood 

In 1521, the Buyck family was granted a title of nobility, knighted, by King Christian of Denmark, according to the laws of heraldry. The King of Arms had the power to assign coats of arms and verify genealogies and noble titles. The knighthood and coat of arms was once again affirmed to be bestowed upon the family by Holy Roman Emperor Archduke Ferdinand I in 1534.

Coat of arms and motto 

The coat of arms is a diamond-shaped shield, bisected blue-grey and red, over a lion from one to the other. The earliest reproduction that is still in storage today is the coat of arms as found on the letter from King Christian of Denmark. Later also on the cover of Elisabeth Buyck’s Album Amicorum.

The heraldic family motto is in the old French languagespelling: « Ainsy Dieu Plaist » (modern spelling: « ainsi dieu plaît »), translating to « as it pleases to God ».

The region where the family originated from is formerly part of West Francia. The formal education was furthermore conducted in French, considered the Lingua Franca of the upper class and the higher culture (see Split of the Catholic University of Leuven). It therefore not uncommon to thus find heraldic mottoes in French.

Etymology 
The origins of the family name are Flemish. They are from a derivative of the ancient Germanic personal name Burghard (see Burkhart) and can compare with the German Buck. It is also found under a Dutch variant, mostly archaic Buijk or Buik.

The Germanic Burkhart originates from the medieval personal name Burkhard from ancient Germanic Burghard. This is composed of the elements "burg" standing for ‘fort castle’ and "hard" as for 'hardy', 'brave' or 'strong’.

Military 
The Buyck family has had a long history of political involvement and has gained recognition for its role military and in politics.

Jean Buyck, Flanders' first Admiral 

Jean (Jan in Flemish) Buyck was a knight, born in Flanders in the 14th century, and commander of the Flemish fleet. He originated from the County of Flanders (also known as Comté de Flandre in French), also known as "Royal Flanders". For centuries, the estates around the cities of Ghent, Bruges and Ypres formed one of the most affluent regions in Europe.

Jean Buyck was called upon to protect the maritime commerce, in particular from attacks orchestrated by Charles VI, he led the Franco-Flemish fleet. On 25 March 1387, in a battle near the River Thames estuary in the English Channel the captain of the Flemish fleet, Jean Buyck, was taken prisoner. As he was the most remarkable seaman in Flanders, Duke Philip the Bold offered the English to exchange him for the natural brother of the King of Portugal who had been taken by the French. But the English, remembering the many damages that this brave captain had caused them, refused this exchange. This battle at the mouth of the Thames where we see the Spanish ships fighting as they had previously done side by side with those of Flanders

Robert Buyck 

Robert Buyck served the Belgian marines and is commemorated for falling at sea in saving a vessel in distress. In 1927, a Brussels’ street was named after him in commemoration.

Political (renaissance)

Joost Sijbrandtszoon Buyck 

In the early modern period, the Buyck family was a wealthy Amsterdam family. Marriages with other prominent traders occurred including families Occo and Heereman van Zuydtwijk.

Several of Buyck family members held important positions in Amsterdam's city council. The most famous member is Joost Sijbrandtszoon Buyck (1505–1588), who served a record seventeen terms as one of the mayors of Amsterdam in the period 1549–1577. He will be sworn in by King Philip II of Spain in 1549. He joined the city counsel at the age of 24 and was recognized as catholic.

Records of Amsterdam’s land register show large polders attributed to the Buyck family. He was father to three children, Gerbrand, Jacob and Cornelis.

It was the Alteratie that brought the ruling of Joost Buyck over the catholic "vroedschap" (the city-council) to an end. On 26 May 1578, 24 city-council members were forced to leave Amsterdam. The revolt escorted the council to the Damrak, where barges had been prepared to take them out of Amsterdam. They settled in Haarlem or Leiden or quietly returned later on.

First joint-stock company in the world

Hendrick Buyck 
A successful merchant and co-founder of the first stock-listed company Hendrick Buyck was born 1551 (buried in Amsterdam, 1613)  brother to Joost Buyck, the Amsterdam mayor, and Jacob Buyck, the last pastor of the Oude Kerck, who fought against the Alteration.

Co-founding the Dutch East India Company (V.O.C.) 

Hendrick Buyck co-founded the Compagnie van Verre (long-distance company) known today as the first and foremost forerunner "companie" that would later establish and unite as the Dutch East India Company (V.O.C. or Verenigde Oost Indische Compagnie). He was part of a company of nine merchants, who had organised a fleet to Java.

All the nine merchants each invested 12'000 guilders: the present value their contribution could buy six canal-side houses in early seventeenth-century Amsterdam. All those that met in the Warmoesstraat (Amsterdam), in May 1594 became "bewinthebbers", the equivalent of "bewindvoerders" or administrators today.

The first page of the V.O.C. capital subscription ledger contains the provision that shares in the V.O.C. could be traded, a prerequisite that made it to be the first joint-stock company. At the foot of the page, the entries of director Hendrick Buyck can be seen.

The management was organised as such to have six "chambers" ("kamers"), with the closest correspondence being divisions in modern corporate governance terms. Of those governing those chambers all administrators were partaking: they were known as the XVIII Lords ("Heren XVIII").

The voyages of the V.O.C. endured long after the passing of the founders with its charter being renewed several times. A total of 4'721 vessels fared to Asia of which 3'356 returned. The company was nationalised in 1795.

Royal matrimony

Marriage between Maria Buyck and Prince Charles Edward Stuart 

In 1688, the Dutch stadtholder William III invaded England with a strong army at the invitation of Protestant politicians. He expelled his father-in-law James II, who had become Catholic, in favor of his eldest daughter Mary. In 1745, James' grandson, known as Bonnie Prince Charlie because of his good looks, invaded Scotland. He unleashed the Jacobite Uprising, which eventually met an unsuccessful end at the Battle of Culloden (1746).

It was Prince Charles Eduard Stuart, the grandson of King James II of England & VII of Scotland which marred pseudonym Jan Hendrik Krijgherman he married Maria Buyck in 1749.

The pseudonym was a consequence of his 1748 protest against the Treaty of Aix-la-Chapelle which had confirmed the British claims of the House of Hanover. On account of this treaty, Charles was required to leave France. Although he continued to visit there in disguise for the next few years, in May 1752 Charles he formally transferred his residence to Ghent.

Whilst he married Maria Buyck, it is believed that Clementina Walkinshaw (born 1720) was the mistress of Prince Charles Edward Stuart.

Diplomatic

Counsel for foreign affairs 
In 1997, by royal decree, the relevance of the steelworks' business led to the appointment as counsel for foreign affairs, to the Belgian Vice Prime Minister, Foreign Affairs and Finance Minister.

Nicolaas Buyck 

Originally from Eeklo, Belgium, in times gone by, from 1684 and 1717, Louis Angebert Buyck was already mayor of the said city.

Nicolaas Buyck is a seasoned diplomat with his first assignment dating back to 1990. He currently serves as Belgian ambassador to Croatia. The Embassy in Zagreb is responsible for Croatia, Bosnia and Herzegovina and Slovenia.

Under his tenure His Excellency established honorary consulates in the cities of Dubrovnik, Opatija and Split. His previous functions as ambassador include his diplomatic posting in Estonia. Nicolaas Buyck first mission was in Kongo-Brazzaville, and was previously posted as ambassador to Tallinn, Estonia in 2008.

Artistic & Cultural

Playwright 

Johann Wolfgang von Goethe wrote the 1788 theatre play called Egmont. It contained historic characters including the Count of Egmont set in Brussels.

The scene is set in Belgium in 1568. Key in the cast are the Duke of Alva and William of Orange, as well as Buyck a Hollander (a native from the former province of Holland), embodying the military arm as archer and reporting to the Count of Egmont.

The opening scene has Buyck, winning the dexterity challenge in crossbow shooting. He then compares his skilfulness to the abilities of Count Egmont:  Ruysum : Daß ich euch sage – Er schießt wie sein Herr, er schießt wie Egmont.

Buyck : Gegen ihn bin ich nur ein armer Schlucker. Mit der Büchse trifft er erst, wie keiner in der Welt. Nicht etwa, wenn er Glück oder gute Laune hat ; nein ! Wie er anlegt, immer rein schwarz geschossen. Gelernt habe ich von ihm. Das wäre auch ein Kerl der bei ihm diente und nichts von ihm lernte.

Extract from Egmont, by Goethe. Buyck's role in the plot characterised Egmont as a strong and effective military leader and reminds the audience of the count's attitude toward religious tolerance. Later, in 1809 Ludwig van Beethoven composed the accompanying musical performance for the Viennese opera house. In 1974 movie of the play was released.

Private library of Jacob Buyck 
The private library of Jacob Buyck, a theologian from Amsterdam from the 16th century, is considered to be an exceptional collection at the time. The library was assembled between 1573 and 1599, and consists of over 1000 books. In 1632, the library was assimilated with the municipal Library of Amsterdam, making it twice as large. Most of the books are still present at the Special Collections Department, mostly in original condition, and there are a few manuscripts of Jacob Buyck himself, including a handwritten catalogue of his library. The content reflects the social and mental world of a conservative, catholic intellectual living in Amsterdam in a turbulent period of Dutch history.

Painting 

Edouard Pierre August Vincent Buyck was a Brugge-born (1888) painter that was active in New York, United States, passing in 1960. Buyck emigrated to the United States during World War I after he was wounded fighting with the Belgium forces.

He practiced lithography, oil painting and etching with prominent pieces found in the Smithsonian American Art Museum. A fire in his studio, in Slingerlands, New York, in 1940 caused many of his works to be lost.

Several artworks were commissioned and include the portrait of Franklin D. Roosevelt which went on display in the White House. Other notable portraits include that of Charles Poletti as justice of the New York Supreme Court.

Architecture 
The family is known to have bequeathed the Belgium architectural landscape, dating back to 18th century.

Neorenaissance 
It was Jean-François Buyck (1761–1836), which worked in the United Kingdom of the Netherlands as a supervisor of bridges, roads and watercourses, in the administration of the Rijkswaterstaat.

From 1831 until 1841 his son  was employed by the city of Bruges, under the direction of city architect Jean-Brunon Rudd. He also became a teacher at the Bruges academy.

In 1842, Pierre Buyck succeeded Jean-Augustin Van Caneghem, as he was appointed provincial architect in West Flanders, responsible for the districts of Bruges, Ostend, Veurne and Diksmuide. The 1876-built castle, intended as a countryside family residence, is now classified as architectural heritage in Flanders.

It was his son  that succeeded him in architecture, building numerous projects for the Flemish authorities. He is recognised for his neo-gothic and neo-romantic style. He is known to have designed the largest state administrative building at time in Zeebrugge, built in 1914.

Contemporary architecture 
Tony Buyck, is a well known architect based in Brussels. He established the recognised firm ARCHI-BURO architects in 1972 after he graduated from Ghent university college St Lukas.

As architect he built experience in designing the Cairo Garden City Center in Egypt, and in Belgium BMW and Mercedes show-rooms and over 100 private owned estates. He is recognised by his avant-garde style.

Tony Buyck is an acknowledged member of the board of College of Urbanism of the Brussels-Capital Region, to which he was first appointed in 2003.

In Brussels Tony Buyck is known to have facilitated the reposition of several hotels, principally through renovation. This includes the Hotel Astoria twice as well as several building adjacent to the Grand Place, for the Hotel Le Dixseptième, all part of UNESCO heritage.

His office also facilitated the transaction of the Steinberger Wiltcher, which succeeded operations from Hilton in the AG Real Estate-owned asset in 2012. The firm acted as advisor to Deutsche Hospitality, an umbrella brand of the German hotel company Steigenberger Hotels.

The Beaux Arts-style hotel was a Conrad until 2012. After a big renovation unveiled in March 2015, the hotel changed its name to Steigenberger Wiltcher's.

Construction steelworks 

Victor Buyck Steel Constrution is named after its founder who established the business in 1927 near Ghent, Belgium. Initially Victor Buyck manufactured small machines for local businesses and farmers before moving into the construction of aircraft hangars, sheds and outbuildings.

Following World War II, much of Europe’s road and rail infrastructure needed to be replaced. Victor’s son John took over the business: today Victor Buyck is divided into two separate business sectors: infrastructure and buildings.

The company has also established operations in Seremban, Malaysia. The Malaysian business operates independently of Europe and about 85% of its work comes from local projects. The company is also active in other countries in Asia including Australia and Singapore.

Most prominently, in Europe, the Gherkin, built-to-suit for the Swiss Re was built by Victor Buyck with construction starting in 2001. The 40-sotrey structure contains 100'000 tonnes of steel and stands at 180 meter, the second tallest structure of the London Square Mile.

In the Grand Duchy of Luxembourg the firm was recognised during the 2015 steel construction awards, more specifically for the KPMG headquarters. The firm has also known for building a temporary structure allowing for the Adolphe bridge in city.

Logomachy 

Acquisition of the H.R.M. Queen of Belgium's mansion

In 1991, after acquiring the private residence of Baroness Vaughan, Queen to Leopold II of Belgium, the Buyck family attracted dispute over the property.

Attempted eviction procedure by challenger mayor

The Brussels' mansion had seen Guy Cudell fail to acquire the property. In a bid to have the Buyck family turn in the asset, the Brussels' Mayor initiated an eviction procedure. Guy Cudell started the process on the grounds that the compulsory purchase was in the public interest.

Advocacy

The Buyck family called upon Belgian royal family's support to fight the procedure. The planning process initiated by the city administration was investigated by the cabinet and diplomatic advisors to the King Albert II of Belgium. They found it contained irregularities causing the eviction proceedings to be invalidated.

Safekeeping

The ownership has since been retained by the Buyck family. To protect the neoclassical property it was recorded as monumental heritage for Brussels in 1993 and later recognised as Belgian monumental heritage in 1994.

Medical field 
Ernest Buyck

Ernest Noël Dominique Buyck, born in 1870, married in Brussels and doctor in medicine was appointed as knight to the Legion of Honor in 1917.

Félix Buyck

Félix Buyck is a published author on spinal trauma. He is a graduate from the Free University of Brussels (Vrije Universiteit Brussel) and was recognised for authoring the study of the Human Brain During High-Frequency Spinal Cord Stimulation during his studies.

The Benelux Neuromodulation Society awarded Félix Buyck for his work on 2019. He was shortlisted for Flemish thesis award in 2020.

Commitment to philanthropy

Notable Belgian board seats 
As Stanford and KULeuven alumna, Cybelle Buyck – Board Member at EIT Food] is as Vice-President Legal and Corporate Affairs sits on the board of the AB InBev Foundation. The foundation was created in 2017 with a mission to reduce the harmful consumption of alcohol globally and bring scientific rigor to the pursuit of AB InBev’s Global Smart Drinking Goals.

Notable Luxembourgish board seats 
Several members of the Buyck family have attended Solvay Business School in Brussels. David Buyck founded the Grand Duchy chapter of the institution. As President, David Buyck initiated numerous initiatives, most notably the prestigious Solvay Finance Tour. The Tour (and its iterations for cities of London and Paris which followed) has the association bestowing €1,000 worth of finance books to the most exceptional finance student each year. The aim is to reward excellence in finance studies and recognise the closet ties that need to be built between academia and the business world.

The Luxembourg Finance Tour offers equal opportunities to all candidates and has received the support of the Luxembourg for Finance, the Luxembourg Stock Exchange, the Banque et Caisse d'Épargne de l'État, Bloomberg L.P., PwC, ING Group, Aperam, UBS, the European Investment Bank and the European Stability Mechanism.

References 

Belgian families
Noble families